Sarotia  is a village in Godda district of Jharkhand state of India.

References

Villages in Godda district